Sambucus mexicana may refer to the following North American black or blue elderberry species:

Sambucus mexicana 
= Sambucus mexicana var. bipinnata 
= Sambucus canadensis 
= Sambucus nigra  subsp. canadensis 

Sambucus mexicana 
= Sambucus mexicana  subsp. cerulea 
= Sambucus cerulea 
= Sambucus nigra  subsp. cerulea

References